Marc Boltó Gimo (born 21 November 1995) is a Spanish field hockey player who plays as a forward for Dutch Hoofdklasse club HGC and the Spanish national team.

Club career
Boltó played his whole career for Atlètic Terrassa but he joined Dutch Hoofdklasse club HGC for the 2021–22 season.

International career
Boltó made his debut for the senior national team in June 2017 in a test match against Belgium. He represented Spain at the 2018 World Cup. At the 2019 EuroHockey Championship, he won his first medal with the national team as they finished second. On 25 May 2021, he was selected in the squad for the 2021 EuroHockey Championship.

References

External links

1995 births
Living people
Sportspeople from Terrassa
Spanish male field hockey players
Male field hockey forwards
Field hockey players at the 2020 Summer Olympics
Olympic field hockey players of Spain
2018 Men's Hockey World Cup players
Atlètic Terrassa players
División de Honor de Hockey Hierba players
HGC players
Men's Hoofdklasse Hockey players